Uropeltis ellioti, commonly known as Elliot's earth snake and Elliot's shieldtail, is a species of snake in the family Uropeltidae. The species is endemic to India.

Etymology
The specific name or epithet, ellioti, is in honor of Scottish naturalist Walter Elliot.

Geographic range
U. ellioti is found in southern India (Hills of Peninsular India. Western Ghats south of the Goa Gap to Tinnevelly. Eastern Ghats: Shevaroys, Coimbatore district, South Arcot, Jalarpet, Vizagapatam district, Ganjam).

Type locality of Siloboura ellioti = "Madras".

Type locality of Silybura punctata = "Pulney hills, Golcondah hills".

Habitat

Description
The dorsum of U. ellioti is dark brown, either uniform or with yellow dots. There is a yellow stripe on each side of the neck, and a yellow stripe on each side of the tail. The venter is dark brown with small yellow dots, and there is a yellow transverse bar across the vent, which connects the stripes on the sides of the tail.

The dorsal scales are in 19 rows behind the head, in 17 rows at midbody. The ventrals number 144–172; and the subcaudals number 6-10.

The snout is pointed. The rostral is about ⅓ the length of the shielded part of the head, the portion visible from above longer than its distance from the frontal. The nasals are in contact with each other behind the rostral. The eye is very small, less than half the length of the ocular shield. The diameter of the body goes 25 to 32 times in the total length. The ventrals are nearly twice as large as the contiguous scales. The end of the tail is convex or somewhat flattened dorsally. The dorsal scales of the tail have 3 to 6 strong keels. The terminal scute has a transverse ridge and two points.

Behavior
U. ellioti is terrestrial and fossorial.

Diet
U. ellioti preys upon earthworms.

Reproduction
U. ellioti is ovoviviparous.

References

Further reading

Beddome RH (1886). "An Account of the Earth-Snakes of the Peninsula of India and Ceylon". Annals and Magazine of Natural History, Fifth Series 17: 3-33.
Gray JE (1858). "On a New Genus and several New Species of Uropeltidæ, in the Collection of the British Museum". Proceedings of the Zoological Society of London 1858: 260–265.
Gray JE (1858). "On a New Genus and several New Species of Uropeltidæ, in the Collection of the British Museum". Ann. Mag. Nat. Hist., Third Series 2: 376–381.
Günther A (1864). The Reptiles of British India. London: The Ray Society. (Taylor and Francis, printers). xxvii + 452 pp. + Plates I–XXVI. (Silybura elliotti, pp. 190–191).
Günther A (1875). "Second Report on Collections of Indian Reptiles obtained by the British Museum". Proc. Zool. Soc. London 1875: 224–234.
Kannan P, Bhupathy S (1997). "Occurrence of the Elliot's Shieldtail snake (Uropeltis ellioti ) in Anaikatty Hills, Nilgiri Biosphere Reserve". Cobra 28: 34–35.
Mukherjee D, Bhupathy S (2004). "Uropeltis ellioti in the diet of Naja naja ". Hamadryad 28 (1 & 2): 109–110.
Smith MA (1943). The Fauna of British India, Ceylon and Burma, Including the Whole of the Indo-Chinese Sub-region. Reptilia and Amphibia. Vol. III.—Serpentes. London: Secretary of State for India. (Taylor and Francis, printers). xii + 583 pp. (Uropeltis ellioti, pp. 75–76).

Uropeltidae
Reptiles of India
Endemic fauna of India
Reptiles described in 1858
Taxa named by John Edward Gray